List of ethnic groups in West Papua, Indonesia:

List

See also
Indigenous people of New Guinea
Ethnic groups in Indonesia
West Papua (province)
List of districts of West Papua
West Papuan languages

References

Ethnic groups in Indonesia
West Papua (province)
West Papua
West Papua